Iyad el-Baghdadi  (born June 17, 1977) is a writer, entrepreneur, and human rights activist who attained international prominence during the Arab Spring. A self-styled "Islamic libertarian," he is an outspoken critic of both Islamic movements and secular dictatorships, and has set himself apart from many other activists through his use of humor and sarcasm.
He contributes to his own blog site Islam and Liberty and podcast Arab Tyrant Manual on Soundcloud.

A stateless Palestinian who was born in Kuwait and raised in the United Arab Emirates, he is now a political refugee in Norway.

Early life

Baghdadi's grandparents lived in Jaffa in what is now Israel. After the creation of the Jewish state in 1948, they left with their infant son, Ismael, who would become Baghdadi's father, and settled in Egypt. Ismael moved to the UAE in 1970. Iyad, born in Kuwait, grew up in the UAE. Until his deportation from the UAE in 2014, he lived in the town of Ajman.

Arab Spring

During the Arab Spring in 2011, Baghdadi began tweeting about the ongoing Egyptian revolution. He provided English translations of Arabic-language statements, chants, and videos. He also strongly supported the uprisings around the Arab world from a pro-democratic perspective. His tweets, many of which not only reported on the latest developments but also provided mocking commentary about the region's dictatorial leaders, gained an enormous following. He is the creator of the widely spread hashtag #ArabTyrantManual and was cited as such by mainstream news reporting.

A February 2011 You Tube video of Egyptian activist Asmaa Mahfouz's call for Egyptians to protest in Tahrir square in Cairo, featuring translation by Baghdadi, was viewed over a million times. Many observers have credited it with helping to bring down the presidency of Hosni Mubarak.

In March 2011, he posted an online collection of his satirical tweets entitled The Arab Tyrant's Manual. Within weeks it was translated into over a dozen languages. He has said that he hopes to publish it in book form.

He is also the author of the two-volume Arab Spring Manifesto, in which he outlined a vision of an "Islamic libertarianism" that he hoped could become the guiding philosophy of his region in the wake of the Arab Spring.

Deportation

On April 30, 2014, he tweeted about his close friend, the Egyptian activist Bassem Sabry, who had just died. The next day, May 1, UAE immigration authorities in his town, Ajman, told him that he faced a choice: either he could be imprisoned for an indefinite amount of time or he could accept immediate deportation. The government provided no official reason for this action. It did not formally charge him with a crime and did not offer him an opportunity to appeal the decision. One official said, "You should try and remember if you said anything that might cause something like this." Baghdadi, who was 36 at the time, chose deportation.

He then spent 13 days in al-Sadr prison in Abu Dhabi, where the conditions were "terrible beyond belief." He was then sent out of the country. Since he is not a citizen of any nation, he had no homeland to return to. By virtue of being a Palestinian refugee, he held Egyptian travel documents. In the event, he was flown to Malaysia, which, he was told, was one of the few countries that would accept a deported Palestinian refugee. At the time, his wife, Ammara, was seven months pregnant.

Upon his arrival in Kuala Lumpur, Malaysian authorities told him that he was not, in fact, welcome in their country. Prohibited from passing through passport control, he stayed in the airport, reading and wandering around. On June 8, thanks to efforts by friends and activists, as well as by the Palestinian embassy in Malaysia, the Malaysian government permitted him to enter the country as
an "exceptional case." Baghdadi did not criticize the UAE publicly for any of this, for fear of what might happen to his family in the UAE if he did.

On June 17, Baghdadi’s birthday, his wife gave birth to a son. He was named Ismael, after Baghdadi's father.

Norway

For six months, Baghdadi was out of the public eye. On October 22, 2014, he re-emerged in Norway, where he delivered a talk at the Oslo Freedom Forum. He said he had only been able to spend three days with his son.

His Oslo Freedom Forum talk was published in November 2014 by Foreign Policy under the title "Why I Still Believe in the Arab Spring." In the talk, he lamented that the youth revolts had given way to "a jihadist Disneyland." He suggested that his own chief contribution to the Arab Spring had been "in the realm of ideas." From the start he had insisted on the importance of having "a statement or manifesto" and a plan for what to do after one's revolt succeeded. The Arab Spring hadn't had that.

Yet he still believed in the Arab Spring, he said, for three reasons. First, the people who created the Arab Spring still existed, and are not a minority: "We only appear to be a minority because we're not organized." Second, their online friendships still exist and "can form the nucleus" of a new campaign. Third, the Arab "ancien regime" has "no vision or hope to offer beyond sectarianism, demagoguery, and jingoism" and thus "lives on borrowed time supported by mass hysteria." Also, dictators are "not afraid of those with guns...they're afraid of those with ideas." Baghdadi insisted that "we are the future. If they don't let us dream, we won't let them sleep."

Baghdadi announced in an October 25, 2014, tweet that he had applied for asylum in Norway.

As of November 2014, he was living in an asylum center north of Oslo, along with many Syrians.
Meanwhile, his wife and son were in Malaysia. "It's heartwarming to see how authorities here treat refugees," he said of his accommodations in Norway. He has since been given the status of a political refugee in Norway.

"I don't want my son to live in fear," he said in a November 2014 interview. "I cannot promise him that he'll live in liberty because I don't know how far we'll go in a single lifetime. But I want him to know that his liberty and dignity are worth his life. And if he ever has to choose to fight for his rights or to live in peace and safety, I want him to not think twice and to choose to fight." He denied that the Arab Spring had proven to be a chimera. "The Arab Spring is a destination," he said, "and the story isn't over. It's very far from over. We will reach our spring."

In a December 2014 article for Foreign Policy, "ISIS Is Sisi Spelled Backwards," he warned against
the notion that Arabs are "forced to either support the ruling autocrats in return for safety and stability, or to side with Islamist radicals in order to throw off the tyrants' yoke and avenge their transgressions."

On December 26, 2015, a Russian news outlet confused Baghdadi with ISIS leader Abu Bakr al-Baghdadi. Other media began echoing the mistake, and Twitter blocked him briefly. The confusion itself ended up becoming a major news story.

In a January 2016 essay for Foreign Policy, Baghdadi argued that "Riyadh's next move won't be in Syria or Yemen – it'll aim to hit Tehran where it really hurts."

As of 2018, he is a fellow of Civita, and has cofounded the  Kawaakibi Foundation, named after Abd al-Rahman al-Kawakibi.

In May 2019, Baghdadi was informed by Norwegian security services that a credible threat existed against his life due to his outspoken criticism of the Saudi Arabian government. The threat had been revealed by the CIA to Norway, who took Baghdadi into protection for his safety.

Comments on Baghdadi

Nicholas McGeehan of Human Rights Watch described Baghdadi's case as "symptomatic of the UAE's paranoia and its fear of critical thought and free speech." H. A. Hellyer, an associate fellow at the Royal United Services Institute, praised Baghdadi's "consistency in criticizing various political forces, dependent on principle, rather than partisanship."

References

External links
 The Radicalization roadmap; Iyad El-Baghdadi
 
 CIRIS Podcast Ilyad El-Baghdadi

1977 births
Living people
Palestinian human rights activists
Arab Spring and the media
Palestinian refugees
Refugees in Norway
Stateless people
Libertarians